Corcovado National Park is an  preserved area of Valdivian temperate rainforest, high peaks, alpine lakes, and rivers in Chile's Los Lagos Region.  This coastal park borders the Gulf of Corcovado to the west and includes the iconic volcanoes Corcovado and Yanteles. This preserved area has no public access infrastructure.

History 

Corcovado National Park represents an innovative joint public/ private conservation effort. While most of the park's area was previously federal land, mostly under the jurisdiction of the Chilean Armed Forces, the 1994 purchase of a key  parcel by the Conservation Land Trust, (now "Tompkins Conservation") and U.S. philanthropist Peter Buckley sparked the effort to transform this area into a national park. In 2002, through an intermediary, Tompkins Conservation founder Doug Tompkins approached then-president Ricardo Lagos with a proposition: If the private lands around Corcovado were given to the people of Chile, would the government contribute the adjoining federal land and create a new national park? The property was not vital to military readiness, and both President Lagos and General Juan Emilio Cheyre, the nation’s top military officer at the time, endorsed the idea. Corcovado National Park, Chile’s fourth largest, was formally designated by President Lagos in January 2005, largely due to his determination.

An expedition to climb Cerro Corcovado was documented in the film 180 Degrees South, a 2010 film directed by Chris Malloy.

Geography and nature 

This wilderness park of approximately  contains some eighty-two lakes, many ringed with ancient forests where pumas haunt the shadows. The park hosts significant biodiversity, with about 18 mammal species, 64 bird species and 133 flora species. The brackish estuaries where the Corcovado and Tic Toc rivers spill into the Bay of Corcovado are exceptional wildlife habitat. Immense colonies of shorebirds coat the beaches. Penguins scamper about the rocks. Marine mammals, including seals and sea lions, thrive in the bay, which was discovered to be a crucial nursery area for blue whales, Earth’s largest animals. The bay, once the lair of pirates, is now proposed to become Chile’s first marine sanctuary, assuring a continuity of protection for wildlife from ocean bottom to mountain peaks.

References 
 Parque Nacional Corcovado

Further reading 

 "Corcovado National Park" Photography by Antonio Vizcaíno. Essays by Ricardo Lagos, Douglas Tompkins, Carlos Cuevas, Juan Emilio Cheyre, and Tom Butler. The Conservation Land Trust, 2012. 

Protected areas of Los Lagos Region
Protected areas established in 2005
National parks of Chile
Nature conservation in Chile
2005 establishments in Chile
2005 in Chilean law